Agence Nationale de l'Aviation Civil (ANAC MALI, "National Civil Aviation Agency") is the civil aviation authority of Mali. Its head office is in Bamako. As of 2014 Issa Saley Maiga is the director general.

References

External links

 Agence Nationale de l'Aviation Civil 

Government of Mali
Civil aviation in Mali
Mali
Transport organisations based in Mali